Carlos Wood Riddick (February 25, 1872 – July 9, 1960) was an American politician and businessman. He served as a Republican member of the U.S. House of Representatives from Montana's 2nd congressional district.

Early life and education
Riddick was born in Wells, Faribault County, Minnesota and was educated in the public schools in Michigan. He attended Albion College in Albion, Michigan and Lawrence University in Appleton, Wisconsin. His sister, Florence Riddick Boys (1873–1963), was a journalist, suffragist, and state official in Indiana.

Career 
From 1899 to 1910, Riddick was editor of the Winamac Republican newspaper in Indiana. Following that he was a rancher and County Assessor of Fergus Co., Montana.

In 1918, Montana's at-large congressional district, which elected two separate members, was abolished, and the 1st and 2nd districts were created in its place. One of the at-large representatives, John M. Evans, opted to run for re-election in the 1st district, while the other, Jeannette Rankin, instead opted to run for the Senate. Riddick ran in the newly created 2nd district, and was narrowly elected over Harry B. Mitchell, the Democratic nominee. He was re-elected in a landslide over M. McCusker in 1920. Rather than seek re-election to a third term, he opted to run for the United States Senate in 1922 to replace retiring Senator Henry L. Myers. Riddick won the Republican primary over State Attorney General Wellington D. Rankin, but in the general election, he lost to Burton K. Wheeler, the Democratic nominee, by a wide margin.

After leaving politics, Riddick served as president of the National Republic, a magazine published in Washington, D.C. He was the operator of a home development at Sylvan Shores in South River, Maryland.

Personal life 
In his later years, Riddick lived in Maryland and Florida. His son, Merrill K. Riddick, was an aviator and perennial candidate.

Riddick died on July 9, 1960 in Fort Lauderdale, Florida. He is interred at Hillcrest Memorial Cemetery in Annapolis, Maryland.

References

External links

 

 US Congress biographical directory
 Political Graveyard
 
 govtrack.us

People from Wells, Minnesota
Albion College alumni
Lawrence University alumni
Editors of Indiana newspapers
Methodists from Montana
1872 births
1960 deaths
Republican Party members of the United States House of Representatives from Montana
People from Pulaski County, Indiana
Journalists from Montana